Ronald Daniel Fayola Hurtado (born 20 June 1995) is a Venezuelan volleyball player. He competed in the 2020 Summer Olympics, held July–August 2021 in Tokyo.

Notes

References

1995 births
Living people
Venezuelan men's volleyball players
Olympic volleyball players of Venezuela
Volleyball players at the 2020 Summer Olympics
People from Ciudad Bolívar
21st-century Venezuelan people